William Bradford (November 4, 1729 – July 6, 1808) was a physician, lawyer, and politician, serving as United States Senator from Rhode Island and deputy governor of the state.

Early life and education

William Bradford was born at Plympton, Massachusetts to Lt. Samuel Bradford and Sarah Gray. He was a great-great-grandson of the William Bradford who had been Governor of the Plymouth Colony. The younger man first studied medicine at Hingham, Massachusetts and then practiced at Warren, Rhode Island.

Career and revolution

Bradford moved to Mount Hope Farm in Bristol, Rhode Island, where he was elected to the colonial assembly in 1761. He was elected to additional terms at various times up until 1803, and served as Speaker of the Assembly in several terms. He expanded his abilities with the study of law, was admitted to the bar in 1767, and established a practice at Bristol. He served as Deputy Governor of Rhode Island from November 1775 to May 1778. He served as major general in command of the colony's militia from June–October 1775 until being relieved by Major General Joshua Babcock.  He was elected to the Continental Congress in 1776, but did not attend.

Bradford served on the Committee of Safety of Bristol County, Rhode Island and from 1773 to 1776 on the Committee of Correspondence for the Rhode Island colony. When the British Navy bombarded Bristol on October 7, 1775, his home was among the buildings destroyed. He afterward went aboard ship to negotiate a cease fire.

After the United States government was established, Bradford was elected to the United States Senate, taking office on March 4, 1793. He was the President pro tempore of the Senate from July 6, 1797 until he resigned from the Senate in October of that year. He returned to his home in Bristol and died there in 1808. Originally buried in Bristol's East Burying Ground, his grave was later moved to the Juniper Hill Cemetery.

Personal life
He married and had a family, including daughter Nancy Ann Bradford. In 1790, she married James DeWolf of Bristol, who was a successful slave trader and belonged to a large and influential family that also went into banking and insurance. He was elected to the US Senate in the 1820s. They were the great-great-grandparents of artist and publisher Charles Dana Gibson.

References

External links

William Bradford entry at The Political Graveyard

1729 births
1808 deaths
Presidents pro tempore of the United States Senate
People from Bristol, Rhode Island
People from Plympton, Massachusetts
People from Warren, Rhode Island
Rhode Island Federalists
Rhode Island lawyers
United States senators from Rhode Island
Burials at Juniper Hill Cemetery
People of colonial Rhode Island
American people of English descent